Inachus phalangium, Leach's spider crab, is a species of crabs from the north-eastern Atlantic Ocean and Mediterranean Sea.

Description
The carapace becomes narrower towards the front of the animal, and is often concealed by epibionts. I. phalangium resembles the closely related species Inachus dorsettensis, but has less prominent spines on the carapace.

Distribution
I. phalangium is found in the eastern Atlantic Ocean, from Norway in the north to West Africa and the Cape Verde islands in the south, and extending into the Mediterranean Sea.

Ecology

Inachus phalangium lives commensally with the sea anemone Anemonia sulcata (snakelocks anemone). The crab gains protection from potential predators by sheltering beneath the anemone's stinging tentacles. The crab eats particles of food dropped by the sea anemone, and mucus from the surface of the anemone.

Taxonomy

The earliest scientific description of Leach's spider crab may have been Carl Linnaeus' description of "Cancer tribulus" in the 12th edition of his Systema Naturae in 1767. Linnaeus' description was, however, too vague to allow the species to be confidently identified. That name is therefore a nomen dubium, and it was suppressed by the International Commission on Zoological Nomenclature in 1964 at the request of Lipke Holthuis. The first valid description was Johan Christian Fabricius' publication of the name Cancer phalangium in his 1775 work Systema Entomologiae. The name Cancer phalangium was later protected by being placed on the Official List of Specific Names in Zoology.

References

Further reading

External links
 

Majoidea
Crustaceans of the Atlantic Ocean
Crustaceans described in 1775
Taxa named by Johan Christian Fabricius